Lipówka may refer to the following places:
Lipówka, Łódź Voivodeship (central Poland)
Lipówka, Lublin Voivodeship (east Poland)
Lipówka, Podlaskie Voivodeship (north-east Poland)
Lipówka, Świętokrzyskie Voivodeship (south-central Poland)
Lipówka, Greater Poland Voivodeship (west-central Poland)
Lipówka, Warmian-Masurian Voivodeship (north Poland)